The National Math and Science Initiative (NMSI) is a non-profit organization based in Dallas, Texas, that launched in 2007. Its mission is to improve student performance in the subjects of science, technology, engineering, and math (STEM) in the United States. It attempts to do this by scaling up local academic programs to a national level.

History of the Initiative
In 2005, the National Academies commissioned a report titled “Rising Above the Gathering Storm” which asserts that student achievement in the subjects of math and science has declined in the United States, while other countries have increased their student achievement scores in the same subject areas. The report recommended the creation of a non-profit organization to help improve math and science education in the United States. Several authors of the report partnered with Peter O’Donnell Jr. to meet this need, effectively establishing NMSI's board of directors and committing to bring both the UTeach and NMSI's College Readiness program (formerly known as NMSI's Comprehensive AP Program and the Advanced Placement Training and Incentive Program [APTIP]) to scale nationally. ExxonMobil invested $125 million to launch the effort,  which was later supplemented by an additional $125 million from corporations, foundations, individual donors and government agencies – creating an effective public-private partnership model that continues to sustain the organization today. Tom Luce, Assistant Secretary of Education under President George W. Bush, was the Founding CEO and Chairman of the Board.

NMSI's Programs
NMSI has expanded three programs to a national scale: NMSI’s College Readiness Program, NMSI’s Laying the Foundation Program, and NMSI's UTeach Expansion Program.

NMSI’s College Readiness Program
NMSI's College Readiness Program is a three-year program in which teachers go through rigorous professional development to better prepare themselves and their students for Advanced Placement Exams.  The prototype for NMSI's program, Advanced Placement Strategies (APS) was launched as a public-private partnership in the Dallas area in 1995 by a group of local businessmen committed to education reform. The goal of the APS program was to improve college readiness and encourage STEM studies for underserved Texas public high school students by increasing participation and performance in AP math, science and English courses. Texas schools in their first year of the APS program increased their exam participation by 198 percent.

In the 2008–2009 school year, NMSI replicated the APS program as the Advanced Placement Training and Incentive Program (APTIP) and in its first year, the program increased enrollment in AP courses by nearly 70 percent, including a 122 percent increase among African American and Hispanic students. The number of passing AP math, science, and English exams also increased by 52 percent, which was nine times the national average; for African American and Hispanic students, the increase in passing AP scores was 71.5 percent.

On September 1, 2012, APS officially merged with NMSI to bring this program to scale throughout the United States.  More than 50,000 students are now enrolled in the NMSI College Readiness Program, and it is currently being implemented in more than 550 schools in 22 states.

The most recent results show a continuing trend of student improvement. Over the life cycle of the NMSI program, the number of average passing scores on AP math, science and English exams increased by 144 percent, compared to 23.2 percent nationally. The average three-year increase in the number of passing math, science and English scores among minorities enrolled in the NMSI program is 219 percent compared to the national average of 48.5 percent. The number of average passing scores for females enrolled in the NMSI program increased by 87 percent, compared to 8.7 percent nationally.

In 2010, the organization received funding from the Lockheed Martin Corporation to launch the AP program in schools serving military bases. In April 2011, First Lady Michelle Obama and Dr. Jill Biden announced the expansion of the program as part of their national Joining Forces initiative, which aims to provide support and resources to military personnel and their families in the areas of employment, housing, health care, education, etc. Mrs. Obama and Dr. Biden made the announcement at a community event at Fountain-Fort Carson High School in Fountain, Colo. As of January 2014, NMSI's College Readiness Program is being implemented in 71 schools serving military families in 18 states.

NMSI's Laying the Foundation Program
In January 2012, NMSI merged with Laying the Foundation, an organization which focused on professional development for math, science, and English teachers, grades 6-12. After the merge, NMSI's Laying the Foundation teacher training program was expanded to include training for elementary teachers, grades 3–5. In 2012, NMSI was selected to work with the Partnership for Assessment of Readiness for College and Careers (PARCC) consortium to lead Common Core State Standards training in 22 states and create the Educator Leader Cadre. 
	
In August 2013, NMSI received a $248,760 grant from the Bill & Melinda Gates Foundation to develop a series of web-based training modules for teachers who have attended NMSI's Laying the Foundation Program.

NMSI's UTeach Expansion Program
The UTeach Program originated at The University of Texas at Austin in 1997, enabling students who are majoring in math, science, or computer science to receive full teaching certification without adding time or cost to their degrees. The national replication process is directed by NMSI in conjunction with the UTeach Institute.

The NMSI-supported replication of the UTeach program for preparing teachers was launched in 2008 in 13 universities in nine states (Arizona, California, Colorado, Florida, Kansas, Kentucky, Louisiana, Pennsylvania, and Texas).

On Jan. 6, 2010, President Barack Obama mentioned the UTeach program at a White House education event, saying, “To bring more educators into the classroom, the National Math and Science Initiative is working with Texas Instruments and the Dell Foundation to prepare almost 5,000 new math and science teachers in the next five years -- through a program that allows young people to earn teaching certificates and science degrees at the same time.” Furthermore, the UTeach Institute projects that 9,000 UTeach program graduates will have impacted 4.8 million secondary STEM students nationwide by 2020.

On February 4, 2014, it was announced that NMSI is expanding the program to 5 additional universities thanks to a $22.5 million grant from the Howard Hughes Medical Institute, bringing the total number of UTeach Replication sites to 40 across 19 states. Another 5 will be added in 2015 through the HHMI funding.

Funding
Major support for the National Math and Science Initiative has been provided by the Exxon Mobil Corporation, the Bill & Melinda Gates Foundation, the Michael & Susan Dell Foundation, and the Texas Instruments Foundation, with in-kind assistance provided by IBM and Perot Systems.
Additional funding for UTeach replication comes from the Texas High School Project, the Greater Texas Foundation, the Tennessee Higher Education Commission, the Tennessee Department of Education, the Texas Education Agency, the Michael & Susan Dell Foundation, and other private philanthropy. With funding from the Carnegie Corporation of New York and the Michael & Susan Dell Foundation, NMSI also is preparing an alumni network for UTeach graduates.

Leadership
Bernard A. Harris, Jr. is the CEO of NMSI.

Board of directors
Shirley Malcom, Ph.D.,
Chairwoman, NMSI;
Senior Advisor and Director, SEA Change
American Association for the Advancement of Science

Dr. David E. Chavez,
Scientist;
Los Alamos National Library

Ken Cohen,
Retired VP Public and Government Affairs
ExxonMobil

Tom Finke,
Chairman
Adara Acquisition Corporation

Dr. Nancy S. Grasmick,
Presidential Scholar
Towson University

Bernard A. Harris, Jr., M.D.,
Business Development & Fundraising, NMSI
Retired NASA Astronaut
President and Founder, Harris Foundation

Talia Milgrom-Elcott,
Founder, Executive Director
100Kin10

Jamison Monroe,
Chairman, CEO
Monroe Vos Consulting Group

Reynold "Pete" Mooney,
Board Chair, Project Hope
Retired Deloitte Principal

Ron Ottinger,
Executive Director
STEM Next Opportunity Fund

Raymond C. Pierce,
President and CEO 
The Southern Education Foundation

Mary Ann Rankin, Ph.D.,
Professor
University of Maryland

Susan Sclafani;
Vice President, Programs
Forum for World Education

Philip Sprick,
VP, Human Resources
Service Corporation International

Lawrence Warder BS, MBA, CPA
Retired

References

External links
 National Math and Science Initiative Website

Mathematics education in the United States
Science education in the United States